Wauwilermoos, a bog respectively drained lake in the canton of Luzern in Switzerland.

 Wauwilermoos internment camp, an internment respectively a Prisoner-of-war camp during World War II in Switzerland, situated in the municipalities of Wauwil and Egolzwil.
 Wauwilermoos pile dwelling settlement, also known as Egolzwil 3, one of the 111 serial sites of the UNESCO World Heritage Site Prehistoric pile dwellings around the Alps.